Thunder Rock may refer to:

 Thunder Rock (play), a 1939 play by Robert Ardrey
 Thunder Rock (film), a 1942 film of the play, starring Michael Redgrave
 Thunder Rock (Carpenterville, Oregon), listed on the NRHP in Oregon
 Thunder Rock Scout Camp, in the state of New York

See also
 Thunderstone (disambiguation)
 Thunderegg, a nodule-like rock formed within rhyolitic volcanic ash layers